Allium austrosibiricum is a species of onion native to Mongolia and southern Siberia (Tuva and Altay Krai). Some sources consider the name synonymous with A. spirale, but others recognize it as a distinct species.

References

austrosibiricum
Onions
Flora of temperate Asia
Plants described in 1987